Trichadenotecnum majus is a species of common barklouse in the family Psocidae. It is found in Europe and Northern Asia (excluding China) and North America.

References

Psocidae
Articles created by Qbugbot
Insects described in 1880